The Popular Socialist Movement (MSP) was a Marxist and pro-independence organization in Puerto Rico.

The MSP was originally known as the Juventud Independentista Universitaria ("University Independence Youth", JIU) and served as the youth wing of the Puerto Rican Independence Party (PIP). The more radical JIU broke off from the Independence Party in 1974 and formed the MSP. The MSP was strongly influenced by Che Guevara and the Cuban Revolution.

In 1982 the MSP merged with the Revolutionary Socialist Party, forming the Workers' Socialist Movement (MST).

References

External links
  Declaration of the MSP (1974)

Communist parties in Puerto Rico
Defunct political parties in Puerto Rico
Political parties established in 1974
Political parties disestablished in 1982
1974 establishments in Puerto Rico
1982 disestablishments in Puerto Rico